Rosaria Aiello (born 12 May 1989) is an Italian water polo player. 

She was part of the Italian team winning the bronze medal at the 2015 World Aquatics Championships, where she played in the centre forward position, and the 2017 World Aquatics Championships.
She participated at the 2016 Summer Olympics.

See also
 List of Olympic medalists in water polo (women)
 List of World Aquatics Championships medalists in water polo

References

External links
 

1989 births
Living people
Sportspeople from Catania
Italian female water polo players
Water polo centre forwards
Water polo players at the 2016 Summer Olympics
Medalists at the 2016 Summer Olympics
World Aquatics Championships medalists in water polo
21st-century Italian women